Woodway Park School and Community College was a comprehensive school in Coventry, England. It had an expanding sixth form.

The school was a brand new build, first opened in September 1968, comprising four Houses: Barcheston, Coleshill, Marton and Stoneleigh. The first Head was Mr Mullaney. It served the local Potters Green community although quite a few pupils did commute by bus from many other parts of Coventry at that time. Boys school uniform was compulsory - grey blazer and an unusual very bright green tie.

It was converted into an Academy called Grace Academy on 31 August 2008 using the same buildings, prior to housing the new academy in new buildings on 31 August 2009.

The movement to new buildings occurs on Wednesday 24 February 2010.

References

External links
 

Defunct schools in Coventry
Educational institutions disestablished in 2008
2008 disestablishments in England